Paul J. Scherrman (born August 27, 1948) is an American politician and businessman in the state of Iowa.

Schermann was born in Prairie du Chien, Wisconsin and attended Campion High School in Prairie du Chien, Wisconsin. He then went to St. Mary's University of Minnesota in Winona, Minnesota. He was vice-president of J. P. Scherrman, Inc. in Dubuque, Iowa. A Democrat, he represented the 33rd district in the Iowa House of Representatives from 1997 to 2003.

References

1948 births
Living people
People from Prairie du Chien, Wisconsin
People from Dubuque, Iowa
Saint Mary's University of Minnesota alumni
Businesspeople from Iowa
Democratic Party members of the Iowa House of Representatives
20th-century American politicians
21st-century American politicians